Software Freedom Day (SFD) is an annual worldwide celebration of Free Software organized by the Digital Freedom Foundation (DFF). SFD is a public education effort with the aim of increasing awareness of Free Software and its virtues, and encouraging its use.

SFD was established in 2004 and was first observed on 28 August of that year. About 12 teams participated in the first Software Freedom Day. Since that time it has grown in popularity and while organisers anticipated more than 1,000 teams in 2010 the event has stalled at around 400+ locations over the past two years, representing a 30% decrease over 2009.

Since 2006 Software Freedom Day has been held on the third Saturday of September. In 2022, this event will be held on 17 September.

Organization 

Each event is left to local teams around the world to organize. Pre-registered teams (2 months before the date or earlier) receive free schwag sent by DFF to help with the events themselves. The SFD wiki contains individual team pages describing their plans as well as helpful information to get them up to speed. Events themselves varies between conferences explaining the virtues of Free and Open Source Software, to workshops, demonstrations, games, planting tree ceremonies, discussions and InstallFests.

Past events 

Note on the figures above: it is difficult to find figures of the early years. The maps on the SFD website are only reliable after 2007, however some years such as 2009 saw extra teams from two different sources which did not "officially" register with DFF. There was about 80 teams from China and a hundred from the Sun community (OSUM) who heavily subsidized goodies for their teams. In the early year of SFD the map was an optional component not connected with the registration script and therefore some teams did not go through the troubles of adding themselves.

Sponsors 

The primary sponsor from the start was Canonical Ltd., the company behind Ubuntu, a Linux distribution. Then IBM, Sun Microsystems, DKUUG, Google, Red Hat, Linode, Nokia and now MakerBot Industries have joined the supporting organisations as well as the FSF and the FSFE. IBM and Sun Microsystems are currently not sponsoring the event. In terms of media coverage DFF is partnering with Linux Magazine, Linux Journal and Ubuntu User. Each local team can seek sponsors independently, especially local FOSS supporting organisations and often appears in local medias such as newspapers and TV.

See also

Outline of free software
Document Freedom Day
Hardware Freedom Day
Culture Freedom Day
Public Domain Day
International Day Against DRM, promoted by the Free Software Foundation in its Defective by Design campaign

References

External links

 Software Freedom Day

Intellectual property activism
International observances
Unofficial observances
September observances
Saturday observances
Holidays and observances by scheduling (nth weekday of the month)
Recurring events established in 2004